Radinghem is a commune in the Pas-de-Calais department in the Hauts-de-France region of France.

Geography
Radinghem lies 20 miles (32 km) northeast of Montreuil-sur-Mer on the D157 road.

History
In the Second World War, the chateau grounds were the site of a V2 launchpad from 1944 to 1945.

Population

Places of interest
 The seventeenth-century château.
 The church of St. Martin, dating from the seventeenth century.

References
 INSEE commune file

Communes of Pas-de-Calais